Mousseau is a surname. Notable people with the surname include:

Alexis Mousseau (1767–1848), farmer and political figure in Lower Canada
France Mousseau or Jean-Marc Généreux (born 1962), French Canadian ballroom dance champion, choreographer and TV personality
Jean-Paul Mousseau (1927–1991), Quebec artist, student of Paul-Émile Borduas, member of the Automatist school
Joseph Octave Mousseau (1844–1898), physician and political figure in Quebec
Joseph-Alfred Mousseau, PC (1837–1886), French Canadian politician
Joseph-Octave Mousseau (1875–1965), lawyer and political figure in Quebec
Michael Mousseau (born 1964), American political scientist

See also
Lac Mousseau or Harrington Lake estate, the official country retreat of the Prime Minister of Canada
Moussa
Mousse
Moussey (disambiguation)
Moussy (disambiguation)
Moussé